The Night We Never Met is a 1993 American romantic comedy film directed by Warren Leight. The film stars Matthew Broderick, Annabella Sciorra and Kevin Anderson.

Plot summary 
Upset with his current living arrangements, Sam rotates occupancy of a flat with slob Brian and painter Ellen.  Each of them get the apartment to themselves two days each week.  Sam and Ellen never see each other, they just leave notes.  When Sam and Brian swap their schedules without telling Ellen, she mistakenly believes Brian is the one she's falling in love with.

Cast

Reception 
Rotten Tomatoes, a review aggregator, reports that 56% of nine surveyed critics gave the film a positive review; the average rating is 4.8/10.  Lawrence Cohn of Variety wrote, "A quintessential New York movie, The Night We Never Met takes a novel premise and develops it in fits and starts." Janet Maslin of The New York Times wrote, "The Night We Never Met is never lifelike enough to evoke the madly romantic New York atmosphere it seems to be after. The actors try hard, but they are hamstrung by too many broad strokes and silly inconsistencies."

References

External links 
 
 
 

1993 films
1993 romantic comedy films
American independent films
American romantic comedy films
1990s English-language films
1993 independent films
1990s American films